The Tally Ho is a public house in north Finchley, north London, under the management of the Stonegate Pub Company.

History
The pub was built in 1927 on a wedge-shaped plot where Ballards Lane in the west meets the High Road (Great North Road) in the east. It replaced the Park Road Hotel on the same site and was originally under the management of Charrington Brewery. The design is gabled all round with Shavian Ipswich windows. It was named after  nearby Tally Ho Corner where in the 1820s and 30s the Tally Ho Coach Company kept horses that were used for the first change of horses for the Birmingham mail coach.

In May 2016, it was announced that the pub, which was under the management of J.D. Wetherspoons, was for sale.  The lease was taken over by the Stonegate Pub Company.

References

External links 

http://pubshistory.com/Middlesex/Finchley/ParkRoadHotel.shtml
http://www.memoriespostcards.co.uk/finchley.htm

Pubs in the London Borough of Barnet
Finchley